Ronald Dassen (born 22 August 1975) is a retired Dutch football defender.

References

1975 births
Living people
Dutch footballers
Fortuna Sittard players
Helmond Sport players
K.S.K. Tongeren players
RKSV Groene Ster players
Dutch expatriate footballers
Expatriate footballers in Belgium
Dutch expatriate sportspeople in Belgium
Eredivisie players
Eerste Divisie players
Association football defenders